Tropidophorus murphyi, Murphy’s water skink, is a species of skink found in Vietnam.

References

murphyi
Reptiles of Vietnam
Reptiles described in 2002
Taxa named by Tsutomu Hikida
Taxa named by Nikolai Loutseranovitch Orlov
Taxa named by Hidetoshi Ota